Sediqullah Atal (born 12 August 2001) is an Afghan cricketer. He made his Twenty20 debut on 7 September 2020, for Kabul Eagles in the 2020 Shpageeza Cricket League. Prior to his Twenty20 debut, he was named in Afghanistan's squad for the 2020 Under-19 Cricket World Cup.

In July 2021, Sediqullah was named in Afghanistan's One Day International (ODI) squad for their series against Pakistan. He made his List A debut on 17 October 2021, for Band-e-Amir Region in the 2021 Ghazi Amanullah Khan Regional One Day Tournament.

References

External links
 

2001 births
Living people
Afghan cricketers
Band-e-Amir Dragons cricketers
Kabul Eagles cricketers
Place of birth missing (living people)